José María Souvirón (1904–1973) was a Spanish poet, writer, and professor.

He was a member of the Generation of '27, an influential group of Spanish poets. He was the founder of the literary magazine Ambos in Malaga (1923). He won the Miguel de Cervantes Spanish National Prize for Literature (1967). He served as a professor at the Catholic University, Santiago, Chile, and held the Director Ramiro de Maeztu chair at the Instituto de Cultura Hispanica, Madrid.

Selected works

Poetry
Gargola (1923)
Conjunto (1928) 
Fuego a Bordo (1932)
Plural Belleza (1936)
Olvido Apasionado (1941) 
Tiempo Favorable (1948)
El Solitario y la Tierra (1961) 
El Desalojado (1969) 
Poesia Entera (1973)

Novels
La Luz no esta Lejos (1945)
El Viento en las Ruinas (1946)
La Danza y el Llanto (1952)
Cristo en Torremolinos (1963)

Essays
"Amarilis" (1935)
"Compromiso y Desercion" (1959)
"El Principe de Este Siglo. La Literatura Moderna y el Demonio" (1967)

1904 births
1973 deaths
20th-century Spanish poets
20th-century Spanish male writers